Dream of the Red Chamber is a Taiwanese TV series based on Cao Xueqin's acclaimed 18th-century novel of the same name. Filmed mostly in Shanghai, the TV series was first broadcast on Chinese Television System from November 1996 to October 1997.

Cast
Chung Pen-wei as Jia Baoyu
Chang Yu-yen as Lin Daiyu
Tsou Lin-lin as Xue Baochai
Tang Lan-hua as Jia Yuanchun
Mao Hsun-jung as Jia Tanchun
Wang Yu-ling & Kuo Huei-wen as Shi Xiangyun (Wang Yu-ling died in 1993 without finishing her scenes)
Hu Huiling as Miaoyu
Hsu Kuei-ying as Wang Xifeng
Lee Hsing-yao as Jia Yingchun
Chang Chiung-tzu as Qin Keqing
Tung Wen-fen as Ping'er
Yang Chieh-mei as Qingwen
Hsiao Ai as Xiren
Hsu Nai-lin as Jia Lian
Fu Lei as Jia Zheng
Han Hsiang-chin as Lady Wang
Hsu Chien-yu as Jia Yun
Wen Shuai as Jia Rong
Fan Hung-hsuan as Jia Zhen
 as Jia Rui
Chen Hao as Jia Huan
Sze Yu as Jiang Yuhan

Awards and nominations
1999 Golden Bell Awards
Nominated—Best TV Series

Links

Works based on Dream of the Red Chamber
Chinese Television System original programming
1996 Taiwanese television series debuts
1997 Taiwanese television series endings
Television shows filmed in Shanghai
Taiwanese romance television series
Mandarin-language television shows